The 2015–16 Ohio Bobcats women's basketball team represented Ohio University during the 2015–16 NCAA Division I women's basketball season. The Bobcats, led by third year head coach Bob Boldon, played its home games at the Convocation Center in Athens, Ohio as a member of the Mid-American Conference. They finished the season 26–7, 16–2 in MAC play by winning the East Division title as well as the overall regular season MAC championship. They lost in the quarterfinals of the MAC women's tournament to Buffalo. They received an automatic bid to the Women's National Invitation Tournament where they lost in the third round to Temple.

Preseason
The preseason coaches' poll and league awards were announced by the league office on October 27, 2015.  Ohio was  unanimously picked to win the MAC East

Preseason women's basketball coaches poll
(First place votes in parenthesis)

East Division
 Ohio (12)
 Akron
 Bowling Green
 Miami
 Buffalo
 Kent State

West Division
 Eastern Michigan (4)
 Ball State (8)
 Western Michigan
 Toledo
 Central Michigan
 Northern Illinois

Regular Season Champion
Ohio (10), Ball State (1), Eastern Michigan (1)

Tournament champs
Ohio (5), Ball State (3), Eastern Michigan (3), Buffalo (1)

Preseason All-MAC

Source

Roster

Schedule
Source: 

|-
!colspan=9 style=|  Exhibition

|-
!colspan=9 style=| Non-conference regular season

|-
!colspan=9 style=| MAC regular season

|-
!colspan=9 style=| MAC Tournament

|-
!colspan=9 style=| WNIT

Awards and honors

Weekly Awards

All-MAC Awards

See also
2015–16 Ohio Bobcats men's basketball team

References

Ohio History and Records
Ohio Women's Basketball Schedule

Ohio
Ohio Bobcats women's basketball seasons
Ohio Bobcats women's basketball
Ohio Bobcats women's basketball
2016 Women's National Invitation Tournament participants